Roots Air was a low-cost airline based in Canada. It started and ceased operations in 2001.

Code data 
IATA Code: 6J
ICAO Code: SSV
Callsign: SKYTOUR

History 
The airline was a brief experiment by clothier Roots Canada outside of its core business. The new discount airline was created in 2000 and service began in March 2001, but was suspended in May 2001 when Air Canada acquired a 30% equity interest and 50% voting stake in Roots Air operator Skyservice. All flights involving Roots Air were transferred to Air Canada.

Services 
Roots Air served the Canadian cities of Vancouver, Calgary and Toronto.  Service to Los Angeles was cancelled prior to Roots Air's launch.   International connections were facilitated by partnerships with other airlines.

List of routes:

 Toronto-Calgary: three daily flights
 Toronto-Vancouver: two daily flights

Fleet 
The Roots Air fleet consisted of the following aircraft:

3 Airbus A320-200 ( C-GTDC, C-FRAA, C-FRAR )
1 Airbus A330-300 (C-FRAE) - arrived in Toronto, but the airline shut down prior to its utilization.
1 Boeing 727-200 ( leased from Kelowna Flightcraft. C-GOKF (Original Braniff Airlines) )

See also 
 List of defunct airlines of Canada

References 

Roots Air Intro
RootsAir Takes Off - CBC

External links 
Rootsair.com (Archive)
Roots official Website

Defunct airlines of Canada
Defunct low-cost airlines
Airlines established in 2000
Airlines disestablished in 2001